Rodrigo Hoffelder (born 14 September 1970) is a Brazilian handball player. He competed at the 1992 Summer Olympics and the 1996 Summer Olympics.

References

1970 births
Living people
Brazilian male handball players
Olympic handball players of Brazil
Handball players at the 1992 Summer Olympics
Handball players at the 1996 Summer Olympics
Sportspeople from Santa Catarina (state)
20th-century Brazilian people